Chiyo Sakakibara (15 July 1898 – 28 April 1987) was a Japanese journalist, educator and politician. She was one of the first group of women elected to the House of Representatives in 1946. In 1948 she was appointed Deputy Secretary of Justice, also becoming the first woman appointed to a cabinet post.

Biography
Sakakibara was born Chiyo Mano in what is now Mishima in Shizuoka Prefecture in 1898. She attended Ferris Japanese-English Girls' School, graduating in 1917. She then studied at Aoyama Girl's Academy until 1919, after which she became a reporter for the magazine Fujin no Tomo (Women's Friend). She later taught at Jiyu Gakuen Girls' School, before marrying the economist  in 1927. The couple had three daughters and a son, who founded the Hippo Family Club. She subsequently studied in Europe with her husband, attending the University of Marburg in Germany and  Selly Oak College in England. She was also a piano teacher.

After the war, Sakakibara was a Japan Socialist Party candidate in Fukushima in the 1946 general elections (the first in which women could vote), and was elected to the House of Representatives. She was re-elected in the 1947 elections, after which she was appointed Deputy Secretary of Justice in the Tetsu Katayama government, becoming the first woman appointed to the cabinet. However, she lost her seat in the 1949 elections.

In 1951 Sakakibara became a member of the National University Management Law Enactment Committee. In the same year she became president of the  school corporation and a director of Aoyama Gakuin.

She died in Tokyo in 1987.

References

1898 births
Japanese schoolteachers
Japanese journalists
University of Marburg alumni
20th-century Japanese women politicians
20th-century Japanese politicians
Members of the House of Representatives (Japan)
Social Democratic Party (Japan) politicians
1987 deaths